The 1972 Spanish Grand Prix was a Formula One motor race held at Jarama on May 1, 1972. It was race 3 of 12 in both the 1972 World Championship of Drivers and the 1972 International Cup for Formula One Manufacturers. The race marked the first time two brothers raced together in F1 simultaneously, Emerson and Wilson Fittipaldi. The elder Fittipaldi was a last-minute substitute for Brabham's Carlos Reutemann, who had injured his ankle in a Formula 2 race the previous weekend at Thruxton, England. The 90-lap race was won by Lotus driver Emerson Fittipaldi after he started from third position. Jacky Ickx finished second for the Ferrari team and his teammate Clay Regazzoni came in third. After the race the World Drivers' Championship was tied at 15 points between Emerson Fittipaldi and Denny Hulme.

Qualifying classification

Classification

Championship standings after the race

Drivers' Championship standings

Constructors' Championship standings

Note: Only the top five positions are included for both sets of standings.

References

Spanish Grand Prix
Spanish Grand Prix
1972 in Spanish motorsport
Spanish